Dovid Leibowitz (1887–1941) was a leading rabbi and disciple of prewar Europe's Slabodka yeshiva in Lithuania, who went on to found the Rabbinical Seminary of America, better known today as "Yeshivas Rabbeinu Yisrael Meir HaKohen" or the "Chofetz Chaim yeshiva", as its first rosh yeshiva (dean) in the Williamsburg area of Brooklyn, New York. The Rabbinical Seminary of America was named after his great-uncle, Yisrael Meir Kagan of Raduń Yeshiva, who was known as the "Chofetz Chaim".

Biography
In his youth, he was known as "Reb Dovid Warshawer". As a teenager, he studied in the Radin Yeshiva, where he held private study sessions with his above-mentioned great-uncle—the founder of the Radin Yeshiva—for twelve hours a day, and helped write the last volume of the Mishnah Berurah. He also learned there under Rabbi Naftoli Trop.

In 1908, Leibowitz transferred to the Slabodka yeshiva, where he learned under the Alter of Slabodka, Nosson Tzvi Finkel. In 1915, Leibowitz succeeded his father-in-law as rabbi of Šalčininkai. After six years, however, he returned to Slabodka as a founding member of the Slabodka kollel.

in January of 1927, Leibowitz came to the United States as a fund-raiser for the kollel and was invited to become the first rosh yeshiva of Mesivta Torah Vodaath. Among his students were Gedalia Schorr and Avraham Yaakov Pam. In 1933, Leibowitz founded Yeshivas Rabbeinu Yisrael Meir HaKohen (the yeshiva is now located in Kew Gardens Hills, New York). There he transplanted to the United States his unique style of Talmud study as well as the Slabodka school of Musar.

On Friday December 5, 1941, Leibowitz died of a heart attack. Because his death was on a Friday, the funeral was held on Sunday December 7, 1941, as to provide proper respect for the deceased. The yeshiva was headed for the following sixty-seven years by his only son, Henoch Leibowitz who died on April 15, 2008, of natural causes.

The yeshiva is now headed by two of Henoch Leibowitz's disciples, Dovid Harris and Akiva Grunblatt.

References

External links
Rabbi Leibowitz's gravestone

1887 births
1941 deaths
Torah Vodaath rosh yeshivas
20th-century American rabbis
People from Williamsburg, Brooklyn
Slabodka yeshiva alumni
20th-century Lithuanian rabbis